Pugachyovsky District is an administrative and municipal district (raion), one of the thirty-eight in Saratov Oblast, Russia. It is located in the northeast of the oblast. Its administrative center is the town of Pugachyov (which is not administratively a part of the district). As of the 2010 Census, the total population of the district was 20,031.

Administrative and municipal status
Within the framework of administrative divisions, Pugachyovsky District is one of the thirty-eight in the oblast. The town of Pugachyov serves as its administrative center, despite being incorporated separately as a town under oblast jurisdiction—an administrative unit with the status equal to that of the districts (and which, in addition to Khvalynsk, also includes one rural locality).

As a municipal division, the district is incorporated as Pugachyovsky Municipal District, with Pugachyov Town Under Oblast Jurisdiction being incorporated within it as Pugachyov Urban Settlement.

References

Notes

Sources

Districts of Saratov Oblast
